Vintilă Ion Constantin Brătianu (16 September 1867 – 22 December 1930) was a Romanian politician who served as Prime Minister of Romania between 24 November 1927 and 9 November 1928. He and his brothers Ion I. C. Brătianu and Dinu Brătianu were the leaders of the National Liberal Party of Romania, founded by their father, Ion C. Brătianu.

Biography
Born at his family's estate of Florica, in Ștefănești, Argeș County, Vintilă Brătianu started his studies at Saint Sava High School in Bucharest.  He then went to France to study engineering at École Centrale Paris from 1886 to 1890.  After returning to Romania, he entered politics.

From 1907 to 1911 he was Mayor of Bucharest. During World War I, he was 
Minister of War (15 August 1916–19 July 1917) and then Minister for War Munitions. 

After the war, he served as Finance Minister (19 January 1922–9 March 1926) in the Liberal government led by his brother, Ion.  After his brother died on 24 November 1927, he assumed the post of Prime Minister of Romania until he was forced to resign a year later to allow the new National Peasants' Party government of Iuliu Maniu to take office. In November 1927 he had also assumed the presidency of the National Liberal Party; he remained in that position until the end of his life. 

On 22 December 1930 Brătianu was at his estate in Mihăești, Vâlcea, when he had a stroke of apoplexy which paralyzed his left side; he died that evening at the hospital in nearby Râmnicu Vâlcea. He is buried at the family estate, Florica, in a crypt where also lie his father Ion C. Brătianu and his brother Ion I. C. Brătianu, as well as his other brother, Dinu Brătianu, and his nephew, Gheorghe I. Brătianu, both of whom died in the early 1950s at Sighet Prison.

References

Gallery

See also  
 Brătianu family

External links
Rulers.org

1867 births
1930 deaths
Vintila Bratianu
People from Ștefănești, Argeș
Members of the Chamber of Deputies (Romania)
Romanian Ministers of Defence
Romanian Ministers of Finance
Chairpersons of the National Liberal Party (Romania)
Mayors of Bucharest
Prime Ministers of Romania
Children of national leaders
Saint Sava National College alumni
École Centrale Paris alumni